Villiers-sur-Marne–Le Plessis-Trévise, more commonly known as Villiers-sur-Marne, is a French railway station in Villiers-sur-Marne, Val-de-Marne department. The station is at kilometric point 20.741 of the Paris-Est–Mulhouse-Ville railway; it is nearby the town of Le Plessis-Trévise hence its name. It is served by RER E.

The station 

Opened on the Paris-Est–Mulhouse-Ville railway in 1857, the station is served since 30 August 1999 by trains of the RER E line going through the E4 branch. It was previously served by suburban trains  from the Gare de l'Est since 1857.

Initially one of the general terminus of the RER E line, the station became a partial terminus (for 4 trains out of 6 at off-peak times and 1 train out of 2 at peak hours) with the extension of this line to Tournan on 14 December 2003.

, the estimated annual attendance by the SNCF was 8,146,119 passengers. This attendance makes this station the fifth busiest station in the Val-de-Marne department.

Service 
There are some 120 trains per working day in each direction between Paris Haussmann–Saint-Lazare and Villiers-sur-Marne station. The first train of the service leaves for Paris at 5:04 a.m. and the last train of the service arrives from Paris at 1:25 a.m. These schedules are valid every day of the year.

The station is served in both directions by: 4 omnibus trains per hour (these make their terminus or departure) & 2 semi-direct trains per hour at off-peak times; 4 omnibus trains per hour (these make their terminus or departure) & 4 semi-direct trains per hour during peak times; 2 omnibus trains per hour (these make their terminus or departure) & 2 omnibus trains between Paris and Tournan in the evening.

Connections 
Several buses stop near the station:

See also 
 List of stations of the Paris RER
 Paris-Est–Mulhouse-Ville railway
 RER E

References

External links
 

Railway stations in Val-de-Marne
Réseau Express Régional stations
Railway stations in France opened in 1999